John Ampomah (born 11 July 1990 in Konongo) is a Ghanaian athlete specialising in the javelin throw. He is currently attending Middle Tennessee State University and is part of the university's track and field team.

Ampomah represented Ghana at the 2016 Summer Olympics in Rio de Janeiro, Brazil. He was the captain of the Ghanaian team in Rio.

Career
Ampomah came onto the scene up 2012, pulverizing the 19-year old national record with a throw of 69.00m in March 2012 in Tamale, before enhancing the record two more times at the African Championship, where he won silver, and at the 2012 rlg Grand Prix where he threw 73.69m. While tutoring at Wiley College, Ampomah set another national javelin record subsequent to gaining a throw of 74.42m on his approach to winning the spear title at the 2014 US NAIA National Championships. This eclipsed the previous mark of 74.35m that he had set at the Jim Mize Invitational on 22 March 2014. On 4 April 2015 he broke the national record again, throwing 76.50m to win his third open air rivalry in Auburn-Alabama. Ampomah's new individual best supplanted the past characteristic of 75.99m, which he set at the CAA African Championships in August, 2015 where he set fifth by and large. Later in the month, John threw 81.55m to improve his national record by 5 meters and 5 centimeters. In Sergey Bubka design, this was then the eighth national record since his disclosure in 2012.

He won silver medals at the 2015 African Games and 2012 African Championships. He also won silver medal at the African Championships in Durban in 2016. His personal best in the event is 83.09 metres set in Soga-Nana Memorial, Cape Coast, Ghana. This is the current national record. Ampomah has broken the national javelin record an unprecedented ten times since 2012 when he came onto the national scene.

Competition record

Seasonal bests by year

2012 - 70.65
2014 - 75.99
2015 - 82.94
2016 - 83.09 NR

Awards
SWAG Male Athlete:2012, 2015

Ghana-Ethiopian Airlines Athletes 2015

References

1990 births
Living people
Sportspeople from Accra
Ghanaian male athletes
Athletes (track and field) at the 2014 Commonwealth Games
Athletes (track and field) at the 2015 African Games
Ghanaian javelin throwers
Male javelin throwers
Commonwealth Games competitors for Ghana
Olympic athletes of Ghana
Athletes (track and field) at the 2016 Summer Olympics
African Games silver medalists for Ghana
African Games medalists in athletics (track and field)
Middle Tennessee Blue Raiders men's track and field athletes